Kelly Michael Gregg (born November 1, 1976) is a radio personality and a former American football nose tackle. He currently contributes to various radio programs in Oklahoma City on 107.7 "The Franchise". He was drafted by the Cincinnati Bengals in the sixth round of the 1999 NFL Draft. He played college football at Oklahoma.

Gregg earned a Super Bowl ring as a member of the Baltimore Ravens practice squad in Super Bowl XXXV. He played with the Ravens through the 2010 season. He spent time in his early career with the Cincinnati Bengals and Philadelphia Eagles, and was a starter for the Kansas City Chiefs in 2011. His nickname Buddy Lee was coined by Tony Siragusa when they first met on the day Gregg signed with the Ravens in September 2000.

Early years
Gregg attended Edmond North High School in Edmond, Oklahoma and was a standout in football and wrestling. In wrestling, he was a three-time state champion, 1993-1994-1995 in the Heavyweight division. He was named wrestler of the year by the Daily Oklahoman in 1995.

In football, he was a two-time All-State selection and was named the City's Defensive Player of the Year by the Daily Oklahoman as a senior in 1994.

College career
Gregg chose to play college football at Oklahoma. Named All-Big 12 first-team as a Junior (1997) and Senior (1998), despite playing for teams with losing records in both seasons.  Recorded 117 tackles during his senior season at Oklahoma in 1998, including a Big 12-leading and still-standing Sooner record of 24 tackles for loss.  His 53 career tackles for loss still rank second all-time at Oklahoma. He also tallied nine sacks in 1998, which still ranks as the 5th best season by a Sooner.  His 19 career sacks are seventh all-time for the sooners. He led the Sooners in tackles his final two seasons with 117 (1998) and 98 (1997), becoming the first defensive lineman to do so in 30 years.  He majored in sociology.

Statistics

Professional career

Cincinnati Bengals
Gregg was drafted by the Cincinnati Bengals in the sixth round (173rd overall) of the 1999 NFL Draft.  He was waived by the team on September 6 then re-signed to the practice squad on September 8.

Philadelphia Eagles
On December 12, 1999, Gregg was signed to the active roster of the Philadelphia Eagles. He was waived on September 12, 2000.

Baltimore Ravens
Gregg was signed to the practice squad of the Baltimore Ravens on September 13, 2000. He earned a Super Bowl ring when the Ravens, having an NFL record-setting defense, beat the New York Giants in Super Bowl XXXV. The following offseason, Gregg recorded six sacks in NFL Europe as a member of the Rhein Fire.

He contributed more as an active member of the roster in 2001, and the following year, after the loss of many veteran members of the 2000 Super Bowl winning defense, including nose tackle Tony Siragusa, Gregg became the full-time starting nose-tackle for the Ravens in 2002. He maintained that starting role through the 2010 season. His first full year as a starter, he collected 56 tackles and two sacks. By the following season, he was already considered one of the toughest nose tackles in the league, especially against the run. 2003 was a standout season for him, as he produced 80 tackles and 2 sacks.

Over the following years, he helped maintain the Baltimore Ravens' reputation as a team with a top notch defense. He was a key part of several multi-game stretches of time where the Ravens defense did not allow a 100-yard rusher in a single game. Perhaps the best stretch of his career, was in 2006 and 2007. In 2006, he was a big part of the Ravens #1 ranked defense, and had a career-high 3.5 sacks. In 2007, he also notched a career-high 83 tackles, as well as 3 sacks.

Gregg was placed on season-ending injured reserve on October 8, 2008 after he underwent microfracture surgery on his left knee. The team signed defensive tackle Brandon McKinney to replace him on the roster. Gregg returned in 2009 and put in a strong year with 63 tackles (46 solo) and 3 sacks. In the 2010 season, he remained the starter, but split playing time with rookie Terrence Cody. He still recorded 34 tackles.

Gregg was released on July 28, 2011, due to salary cap constraints.  While never voted to a Pro Bowl in his ten years as a Baltimore Raven, he was often considered one of the most effective nose tackles—and one of the most underrated players—in the league. In 10 years as a Raven, he notched over 500 tackles, and 19.5 sacks, and 27 post-season tackles.

Kansas City Chiefs
Gregg was signed by the Kansas City Chiefs on July 30, 2011. In the 2011 season, Gregg finished with 39 tackles and 1 sack.

Career statistics

References

External links
Baltimore Ravens bio

1976 births
Living people
Players of American football from Wichita, Kansas
Sportspeople from Edmond, Oklahoma
American football defensive tackles
Oklahoma Sooners football players
Cincinnati Bengals players
Philadelphia Eagles players
Baltimore Ravens players
Rhein Fire players
Kansas City Chiefs players